Jharana Thapa (born as Jharana Rajbhandari on March 28, 1980) is a Nepalese film actress, film producer and film director. She made her Kollywood debut in Daijo (1996) opposite star actor Bhuwan K.C. She played the leading lady role in many movies. She received critical acclaim for her breakout role in the 1998 movie Dharam Sankat.

After working in Nepali cinema for 20 years, she turned into a film director. Her debut directorial movie A Mero Hajur 2 was released in September 2017.

Early life
Jharana Thapa was born on 28 March 1980 in Pyuthan, Nepal.

Filmography

Actress

Awards

References

External links
 
 

1970 births
Living people
Nepalese film actresses
20th-century Nepalese actresses
21st-century Nepalese actresses
People from Pyuthan District
Nepalese women film directors
Actresses in Nepali cinema

Nepali Congress politicians from Lumbini Province